The House at 483 Summer Avenue in Reading, Massachusetts, USA, is a modestly decorated vernacular Federal style cottage. The -story wood-frame house was built c. 1830, late for a Federal style building. Its significant Federal features are its five-bay facade, side-gable roof, and the door surround, which has pilasters supporting a tall entablature with a projecting cornice. The house is finished in wooden clapboards, and has two gabled dormers projecting from the front roof.

The house was listed on the National Register of Historic Places in 1984.

See also
National Register of Historic Places listings in Reading, Massachusetts
National Register of Historic Places listings in Middlesex County, Massachusetts

References

Houses on the National Register of Historic Places in Reading, Massachusetts
Houses in Reading, Massachusetts
1830 establishments in Massachusetts
Federal architecture in Massachusetts